François Zalacain (born 11 February 1940 in France) is a record producer and the founder of Sunnyside Records. Sunnyside Records took the top spot in the 2011 DownBeat Critics Poll.

A girl in a sailor dress skips rope. She's pretty, she's free, she's having fun. She's the logo for Sunnyside Records. Founder Francois Zalacain's friend Chris Coffey discovered her on a rubber stamp in a Greenwich Village shop in 1980. "It says everything we want to say. Music is about bouncing, dancing. And my wife liked it."

With no binding contracts, no specific mission, and an acceptance of any jazz style, Sunnyside is a relaxed independent label. We simply release music that we like, from a flirtatious disc of boleros from Spanish singer Martirio, to an eloquent disc from pianist Laurent Coq. We also license albums from European labels that otherwise would not be available in the United States.

Zalacain started the company in 1982 after a career at IBM.  He met pianist Harold Danko one night at the Village Vanguard and a friendship ensued. When Danko had the idea to make a duo disc with bassist Rufus Reid, Zalacain rented Penthouse Recordings studio overlooking the East river and recorded the album. Soon after he recorded Kirk Lightsey playing solo piano. A Lee Konitz album followed, and without meaning to, Zalacain had established a record label. Two decades later, hundreds of CDs make up Sunnyside's catalog.

Sunnyside's relationship with their artists is more like an affair than a marriage, Zalacain explained. "They stay with us because they like to stay." Some artists have been with the label for many years. And others are just starting out the jazz life. Usually Sunnyside finds new artists through their current ones. "It happens the way you make friends," he said. "A friend invites you to his house - you make a new friend."

Aside from good music, Sunnyside looks for a unique voice. "That's what you're looking for," said Zalacain. "Why is a jazz singer going to attract your ear? Because she has something unique. It's the same with instrumentalists."

The biggest thrill so far came in 2003 when Brazilian singer Luciana Souza's album Brazilian Duos was nominated for a Grammy. "The nomination was very surprising, because it was a record of Brazilian songs. She sang in Portuguese. To be nominated for Best Jazz Vocal Album was a happy surprise," Zalacain said.

The crew went to Madison Square Garden for the event and waited for three hours for the Jazz Vocal Album category. Diana Krall won, as the group had expected, so they set off for a nice dinner at the trendy, French-Thai restaurant, Vong. When they arrived, the host asked them where they had come from. They told him they had been at the Grammy Awards. He said "My father was a musician." "He was the son of Lee Morgan!" exclaimed Zalacain. "We didn't win the Grammy but we met the son of Lee Morgan that night."

With a larger distribution, first Ryko in 2002 and all the electronic stores, the label added many licenses to its catalog, most of them coming from France. Sunnyside also licenses albums from the Spanish label Karonte. " I was surprised to find that there is a taste in the U.S. for this music," Zalacain said. "There is a taste for not only music recorded here but also music from other places."

While many of Sunnyside's own artists bring influences from their native lands to their music, most of them currently live in New York. "Nationality has no relevance, but we like them to live here," he said. "It's difficult to have an affair with people not in your city."

References 
 Article Sunnyside Records on allaboutjazz.com
 Catalogue Sunnyside Records
 Article about François in Jazzman
 Article about François in Jazz News 
 Credits François Zalacain as producer

Living people
French media executives
1938 births